Mount Julius Caesar is a 13,213-foot-elevation (4,027 meter) mountain summit located on the crest of the Sierra Nevada mountain range in northern California, United States. It is situated in the John Muir Wilderness on the boundary that Sierra National Forest shares with Inyo National Forest, and along the common border shared by Fresno County with Inyo County. Italy Pass is one-half mile immediately south of the summit, and Granite Park lies to the southeast. Mount Julius Caesar ranks as the 106th-highest summit in California.

History

The first ascent of the summit was made August 12, 1928, by Alfred and Myrtle Prater. This landform was named by the first ascent party to honor Julius Caesar, with the connection attributable to its position overlooking Lake Italy. The north face and east arête was climbed August 9, 1953, by Jim Koontz, Pete Murphy, Al Wolf, and Ed Toby. The first winter ascent was made March 18, 1965, by Tom Ross and Peter Lewis. The present spelling of the toponym was officially adopted in 1978 by the U.S. Board on Geographic Names.

Climate
According to the Köppen climate classification system, Mount Julius Caesar is located in an alpine climate zone. Most weather fronts originate in the Pacific Ocean, and travel east toward the Sierra Nevada mountains. As fronts approach, they are forced upward by the peaks (orographic lift), causing them to drop their moisture in the form of rain or snowfall onto the range. Precipitation runoff from the west side of this mountain drains into Lake Italy which is within the San Joaquin River watershed, and from the east side to Pine Creek, thence Owens Valley.

Gallery

See also
 
 List of the major 4000-meter summits of California

References

External links
 Weather forecast: Mount Julius Caesar

Inyo National Forest
Sierra National Forest
Mountains of Inyo County, California
Mountains of Fresno County, California
Mountains of the John Muir Wilderness
North American 4000 m summits
Mountains of Northern California
Sierra Nevada (United States)